Phenol-Explorer is a comprehensive database on natural phenols and polyphenols including food composition, food processing, and polyphenol metabolites in human and experimental animals.

See also 
 Food composition data

References

External links 
 Phenol-Explorer

Polyphenols
Natural phenols
Food databases
Biological databases